Andiarpalayam is a village in Ariyankuppam Commune in the Union Territory of Puducherry, India.

Geography
Andiarpalayam is bordered by Pooranankuppam in the north, Nallavadu in the east, Madalapet (Tamil Nadu) in the south and Thavalakuppam in the West

Demographics
Andiarpalayam has an average literacy rate of 81.49%, male literacy is 88.89%, and female literacy is 74.13%. In Andiarpalayam, 10% of the population is under 6 years of age.

Transport
Andiarpalayam is located at 1.5 km from Thavalakuppam on Thavalakuppam – Nallavadu Road. One can reach Thavalakuppam Koot Road by any local bus from Pondicherry to Bahoor, Madukarai and Karaiyanputtur running via Ariyankuppam. From Thavalakuppam Koot Road, it is a 1.5 km walk east to reach Andiarpalayam. Andiarpalayam can also be reached directly by PRTC Bus (Route No. 14A) running between Pondicherry and Nallavadu.

Road Network
Andiarpalayam is connected to Pondicherry by Thavalakuppam–Nallavadu Road. There is another road from Andiarpalayam to Thavalakuppam via Korukamedu.

Tourism

Singirikudi Lakshminarashimhar Koil
Singirikudi Lakshminarashimhar Koil is located at 3 km from Andiarpalayam. Singirikudi is famous for the Ugira Narashimhar.

Villages under Andiarpalayam Village Panchayat
 Andiyarpalayam
 Kasanthittu
 Korukamedu
 Pillaiyarthittu
 Thanampalayam

Politics
Andiarpalayam is a part of Manavely (State Assembly Constituency) which comes under Puducherry (Lok Sabha constituency)

References

External links

Official website of the Government of the Union Territory of Puducherry
Kailash Beach Resort

Villages in Puducherry district
Ariyankuppam